Arthur Chapman (1838 – 8 May 1909) was a businessman in Adelaide, South Australia, closely associated with the Theatre Royal, Adelaide.

History
James Chapman, a tailor and draper of Kent, England, emigrated to South Australia with his wife Mary and their seven children aboard Rajah, arriving at Adelaide in April 1850. He founded a drapery on Hindley Street, at that time the premier business strip in the young city.

Arthur Chapman was educated at J. L. Young's Adelaide Educational Institution and began working for his father, then after some experience at the gold diggings at Goulburn, Victoria, where he worked as assistant in a general store for three years, returned to Adelaide and took up some clerical work. He then went into business on his own account at the Register Chambers as liquidator, in 1869 taking on Michael Kingsborough as partner, in Kingsborough & Chapman, land agents and investment brokers, with an office in the Advertiser Building. Among their staff was Harry Dickson Gell, later chairman of trustees of the State Bank. They dissolved the partnership seven years later, and in 1886 Chapman went into business as hotel broker and licensed valuator, with an office in Pirie Street.
On the death that year of his brother Edgar Chapman, of the brewing firm of Simms & Chapman, he took over management of his estate, which included the Theatre Royal in Hindley Street, though he was acting for the ailing brother as early as 1883, In January 1885 he had joined George Rignold and James Allison as lessee and in December they withdrew from the partnership, leaving Chapman as sole manager until Wybert Reeve became lessee in 1887.

Chapman initiated extensive alterations in 1905 at a cost of over £4,000 and a rebuild of the theatre in 1913–1914 at a cost of £21,000.
He was a prominent Freemason.

Family
James Chapman (1804 – 15 June 1879) married Mary Stanford (1804 – September 1895). Their children included:
Stanford Chapman (1829 – 8 October 1905) married Martha Moon ( – 6 August 1912) in London on 9 December 1854. He was admitted to the firm of Virgoe, Son in 1865, became  Virgoe, Son & Chapman, of Melbourne and Sydney, lived in Hawthorn then Kew, Victoria 
Alice Mary Chapman (2 December 1855 – 19 August 1911) married John Donaldson of Victoria
Horace Marchent Chapman (17 November 1860 – )
Edith Annie Chapman (19 December 1863 – ) married William St. Clair ( – ) on 11 December 1889
Herbert Henry Chapman (17 January 1868 – 31 January 1912) born in Victoria
Edgar Chapman (1831 – 11 September 1886) married Frances Rachael Kelsh ( – 1890) in 1853. He was with Simms & Chapman, brewers
Charles Edgar Chapman (1854 – 4 September 1920) married to Margaret Teresa Chapman (c. 1861 – 3 January 1916)
Clara Mary Chapman (1856 – 25 September 1925) married Clement Ferdinand Vaux Rainsford (c. 1859 – 12 September 1935) in 1882
Harry Albert Chapman (1858 – ) sheep farmer with brother C. E. Chapman; insolvent 1883
Emma Victoria Chapman (1860 – )
Edgar Stanford Chapman (1862–1872) drowned in vat of hot hops liquor
Fanny Emily Chapman (1863–1886) married Edward Headly/Heasley Hallack in 1885, his second wife
Lily Kate Chapman (1865 – ) married James Cunningham on 16 April 1890
Albert Chapman (1834 – 21 June 1902) of Paddington, Sydney
Emma Chapman  (1836 – 15 November 1896)
Arthur Chapman (1838 – 8 May 1909) married Sarah Bullock ( – 27 September 1904) in 1863. She was the eldest daughter of John Bullock
Frederick Arthur Chapman (10 March 1864 – 18 September 1925) of Lion Brewing and Malting Company
Stanley Irwin Chapman (1892 –29 September 1940) also of Lion Brewing and Malting Co.
Laura Simmons Chapman (13 May 1865 – 31 December 1946) married Arthur White ( – 20 June 1943) on 11 December 1901
Percy James Chapman (30 December 1866 – 4 January 1946) married Mabel Adelaide Barnfield in 1896
Arthur Ernest Chapman (1868 – 20 January 1890)

Nina Blanche Chapman (1874 – 30 July 1952) married Frederick Charles Sach on 8 November 1911
Frank Burley "Jack" Chapman (1877 – 4 March 1917) married Agnes, killed in France, WWI
Mary Chapman (1840–1910)
Louisa  Chapman (1844 – 25 September 1883) lived with her mother, King William Street south

References 

1838 births
1909 deaths
Australian theatre managers and producers
19th-century Australian businesspeople
Businesspeople from Adelaide
Australian people of English descent